Shamim Ara Nipa is a Bangladeshi dancer and choreographer. She serves as a director of Nrityanchal Dance Company. She was awarded Ekushey Padak by the Government of Bangladesh in the category of choreography in 2017.

Career
Nipa got her first lesson in dancing at Arts Council of Kishoreganj District. She studied under the dance instructors G A Mannan and Nikunja Bihari Pal. Later she received training at Bulbul Academy of Fine Arts. She received training from a North Korean dance trainer and the National Centre for the Performing Arts (China).

Since 2011 Nipa, together with Shibli Mohammad, has been compering the weekly dance magazine program, Tarana, on Bangladesh Television.

Awards

Nipa received a gold medal for the best dance artiste in Dhaka division and has been nominated best dancer by Bangladesh Folk Forum, the National Youth Council and other institutions. 
 Lux Channel I Performance Award
 Prothom Alo Award
 Bachsas Award
 George Harrison Award
 Ekushey Padak (2017)

References

Living people
Bangladeshi female dancers
Recipients of the Ekushey Padak
Year of birth missing (living people)
Bangladeshi choreographers